Rachael Katherine Hannah Scott, Lady Deuchar  (born 25 February 1958) is a British art historian, and Professor in the History of Art, Courtauld Institute of Art, since 2014.

She was born in New York on 25 February 1958, the daughter of diplomat Sir Peter Scott, and Rachael Scott (née Lloyd Jones).
She was educated at Cheltenham Ladies' College, University College London, where she earned a BA and a PhD, and Christ's College, Cambridge, where she earned an MA in 1985.

Honours
Scott was elected a Fellow of the British Academy in 2019.

Family
In 1982, she married Stephen Deuchar (later Sir Stephen John Deuchar CBE DL). The couple has one son, and three daughters.

References

Living people
British art historians
Women art historians
1958 births
Alumni of University College London
Alumni of Christ's College, Cambridge
People educated at Cheltenham Ladies' College
Fellows of the British Academy
Wives of knights